Tatyana Aleksandrovna Kraynova (born June 7, 1967 in Leningrad) is a former Soviet competitive volleyball player and Olympic gold medalist.

References

External links
 

Soviet women's volleyball players
Olympic volleyball players of the Soviet Union
Volleyball players at the 1988 Summer Olympics
Olympic gold medalists for the Soviet Union
1967 births
Sportspeople from Saint Petersburg
Living people
Russian women's volleyball players
Olympic medalists in volleyball
Medalists at the 1988 Summer Olympics